Finlay Hart (1901 – 27 December 1989) was a Scottish communist politician.

Born in Clydebank, Hart attended Clydebank High School.  He became politically active when he joined the Workers International Industrial Union in 1915 while working at the William Beardmore and Company shipyard, in Dalmuir.  Part of the Red Clydeside movement, in 1917, he joined the Socialist Labour Party, and he was part of the majority from that party who founded the Communist Party of Great Britain (CPGB).  In 1923, he emigrated to Edmonton in Canada in an attempt to find work, joining the Communist Party of Canada, but he returned to Clydebank in Scotland by 1926, where he worked as a plumber.

In 1934, Hart was a leading figure in a Glasgow to London hunger march.  The following year, he was elected as the first communist councillor in Clydebank, although he resigned in 1937 to move to London and become National Industrial Organiser for the CPGB.  He also held various District Secretary posts for the party: Scotland in 1935, the North Midlands from 1939 to 1940, and South Yorkshire from 1940 to 1942.  Hart was a delegate to the Seventh Congress of the Communist International in Moscow.

Hart stood for parliament on three occasions, West Dunbartonshire in 1950, and Glasgow Springburn in 1955 and 1959, but was never elected.  During the 1950s, Hart served as Chairman of the Scottish Committee of the CPGB.

Hart was subsequently re-elected to Clydebank Town Council, and also to Dunbartonshire County Council.  He retired from his party posts in 1963, but later became Provost of Clydebank and participated in the Upper Clyde Shipbuilders work-in.

References

1901 births
1989 deaths
Communist Party of Great Britain councillors
Communist Party of Canada politicians
Councillors in Scotland
People from Clydebank
Provosts in Scotland
Scottish communists
Socialist Labour Party (UK, 1903) members
People educated at Clydebank High School